Opale is a small settlement in the hills southeast of Žiri in the Upper Carniola region of Slovenia.

Geography
Opale is made up of the hamlet of Martinj Vrh at the crossroads in the center of the village's territory plus the hamlets of Log to the north, and Opale and Laznar to the west, as well as individual farms.

Name
Opale was attested in historical sources as Goreniissgori (i.e., Gorenje Izgorje 'upper Izgorje') in 1500.

References

External links

Opale on Geopedia

Populated places in the Municipality of Žiri